The 1990 Belgian Indoor Championships was a tennis tournament played on indoor carpet courts. It was the 9th edition of the event known that year as the Belgian Indoor Championships, and was part of the ATP Championship Series, double-week events of the 1990 ATP Tour, running concurrently with the 1990 SkyDome World Tennis Tournament. It took place at the Forest National in Brussels, Belgium, from 12 February until 18 February 1990. First-seeded Boris Becker won the singles title.

Finals

Singles

 Boris Becker defeated  Carl-Uwe Steeb, 7–5, 6–2, 6–2
It was Becker's first singles title of the year, and the 25th of his career.

Doubles

 Emilio Sánchez /  Slobodan Živojinović defeated  Goran Ivanišević /  Balázs Taróczy, 7–5, 6–3
It was Sánchez's first doubles title of the year, and the 27th of his career.
It was Živojinović's first doubles title of the year, and the eighth of his career.

References

 
Donnay
+